Dattatraya Ganesh Godse (Devanagari: दत्तात्रय गणेश गोडसे, द. ग. गोडसे)  was an Indian historian, playwright, art critic, art director, theatre and costume designer, and illustrator. He received a Sangeet Natak Akademi Award in 1988. He wrote almost exclusively in Marathi.

Early life and education
He was born in Vadhode village in Jalgaon district of Bombay Presidency, British India. He did his schooling in Saoner Nagpur. He attended Morris College, Nagpur and Wilson College, Mumbai. He obtained a Bachelor of Arts degree in Marathi and English. He was also trained in fine arts at Slade School of Fine Art.

Wife: Sheela Godse,
Daughter: Medha Keeriyott,
Son: Anand Godse

Career
Godse wrote on a wide range of subjects: historical figures including Shivaji, Mastani, and Ramdas; literature; plays; architecture; sculpture; and art, including Buddhist art. He wrote an essay on Thomas Daniell's 1790 painting of the Peshwa court at Pune.

In the manner of the historians and critics Vishwanath Kashinath Rajwade, Madhukar Vasudev Dhond, Godse wrote almost exclusively in Marathi.

Ashok R. Kelkar, a scholar in linguistics, literature, and semiotics, commented that Godse's work is "a body of important, if controversial, work in art history from the vitalist point of view." He added that Godse's decision to write in Marathi was "fortunate in so far as it was instrumental in bringing art history home to the Marathi reader."

Godse illustrated many books and magazines. He was theatre designer for over one hundred and seven plays. He also was art director for three Marathi and two Hindi films.

Books
 Vada-Savada Ani Nishada Sama (2003) (Coauthored with M.V. Rajadhyaksha)
 Daphtanī दफ्तनी (1992)

 Nangi Asalele Phulapākharū  नांगी असलेले फुलपाखरू (1989)
 Mastānī  मस्तानी (1989)
 Ūrjāyana   उर्जायन  (1985)
 Mātāvala मातावळ (1981)
 Samande Talāśa  समंदे  तलाश (1981)
 Gatimānī गतिमानी (1976)
 Kālagangechyā Kāthī काळगंगेच्या  काठी (1974)
 Shakti Saushthava  शक्ती सौष्ठव (1972)
 Pota   पोत (1963)
 Lokghati लोकघाटी
 Pratima प्रतिमा (translation)
 Shakuntala शाकुन्तल (Translation of Abhijñānaśākuntalam)
 Song सोंग
 Sambhajiche Bhoot संभाजीचे भूत
 Kahi Kavadse काही कवडसे
  Essay on Dinanath Dalal: 'The Genius from an Enchanted land’

References

Further reading
 D.G. Godse Yanchi Kalamimansa, Edited by Sarojini Vaidya, Vasant Patankar (Marathi), 1997 ("द. ग. गोडसे यांची कलामीमांसा" संपादक: सरोजिनी वैद्य, वसंत पाटणकर)Publisher: Department of Marathi, Mumbai University and Popular Prakashan

External links

 Article on D G Godse by M.V. Rajadhyaksha in a Marathi newspaper
 Article on D G Godse by artist Bal Thakur in a Marathi newspaper

Indian illustrators
Indian male dramatists and playwrights
Marathi-language writers
Indian art historians
Indian art critics
1914 births
1992 deaths
University of Mumbai alumni
20th-century Indian dramatists and playwrights
20th-century Indian historians
Dramatists and playwrights from Maharashtra
20th-century Indian male writers
Recipients of the Sangeet Natak Akademi Award